Maliarpha fuscicostella is a species of snout moth in the genus Maliarpha. It was described by Cook in 1997, and is known from Papua New Guinea (including Bubia, the type location).

References

Moths described in 1997
Anerastiini